The year 1834 in archaeology

Excavations
 Excavations made at Meroë by Giuseppe Ferlini

Explorations
 Juan Galindo explores the Maya ruins of Copan
 French scholar Charles Texier finds the first Hittite site but does not identify it as such

Finds

Miscellaneous
 John Clayton begins to safeguard Hadrian's Wall

Births

April 30 - John Lubbock, English prehistorian (d. 1913)

Deaths

See also
 List of years in archaeology
 1833 in archaeology
 1835 in archaeology

References

Archaeology
Archaeology by year
Archaeology
Archaeology